Professor Dowell's Head is a 1925 science fiction and horror story (and later novel) by Russian author Alexander Belyaev.

Plot

Professor Dowell and his assistant surgeon Dr. Kern are working on medical problems including life support in separated body parts. Dr. Kern kills Dowell (in a set up car / asthma accident). Professor Dowell's head is now kept alive and used by Dr. Kern for extraction of scientific secrets; however, his new assistant, the medically trained Marie Loren, discovers the ploy and is dismayed; to keep her from exposing him, Kern eventually gets her imprisoned in a false lunatic asylum for undesirables. Continuing his experiments, Dr. Kern transplants the head of a young woman to a new body. That body belongs to the girlfriend of a friend of Dowell's son, who recognizes her body when the young woman flees Dr. Kern's laboratory. Together, Dowell's son and his friend free Marie Loren. Dr. Kern is anxious to announce himself as the inventor. But Dowell's son and Marie Loren help his father's head get in front of the cameras and reveal the truth. The head of professor Dowell tells all before dying. Dr. Kern, disgraced, is summarily executed by a police detective.

English translations
Belyaev, Alexander, Professor Dowell's Head, translated by Carl Engel, King Tide Press, Philadelphia, 2021
Professor Dowell's Head, New York: Macmillan Publishing, 1980, hardcover, ISBN.

Scientific links

Real head transplant operations were semi-successfully done in Soviet Union and United States, though not on humans, and the subjects died in less than a day.

The possibility to transfer living brains into robots has been considered as a potential life-saving option for terminal patients.

Film adaptations
The novel was very loosely adapted to film under the title Professor Dowell's Testament (1984) by director Leonid Menaker. The film only used the basic premise of the novel and made numerous changes to the characters and story.

The Head in the House, a Chinese version of film adaptation, was made by the Xi'an Film Studio in 1989.

The Head (1959)

References

External links
Professor Dowell's Head at WorldCat.
Zaveshchaniye professora Douelya, 1985 Russian film adaptation directed by Leonid Menaker at IMDb.
Illustrations of Ukrainian graphic artist Alexander Dovhal to Professor Dowell`s Head

1925 Russian novels
1925 science fiction novels
Russian science fiction novels
Soviet science fiction novels
Novels by Alexander Beliaev
Debut science fiction novels

Russian novels adapted into films
1925 debut novels